Mount Hazlett is a mountain,  high, at the south side of the mouth of Montecchi Glacier where the latter enters Tucker Glacier, in the Victory Mountains of Victoria Land, Antarctica. It was mapped by the United States Geological Survey from surveys and U.S. Navy air photos, 1960–64, and was named by the Advisory Committee on Antarctic Names for Paul C. Hazlett, a member of the U.S. Navy Squadron VX-6 winter party at McMurdo Station, 1968.

References

Mountains of Victoria Land
Borchgrevink Coast